Amblyodipsas concolor, also known as the KwaZulu-Natal purple-glossed snake or Natal purple-glossed snake, is a species of venomous rear-fanged snake in the Atractaspididae family.

Geographic range
It is endemic to Southern Africa. More specifically it is found in the northeastern and eastern parts of the Republic of South Africa and in Eswatini. Its range probably extends into southern Mozambique.

Description
Dorsally dark brown or purple-black, with purple gloss. Ventrally pale blackish purple, the ventrals margined behind with livid white. Dorsal scales in 17 rows. Ventrals 133–157; subcaudals 28–39. Total length ; tail .

References

Smith, A. 1849. Illustrations of the Zoology of South Africa, Volume 3 (Reptiles). Smith, Elder, and Co. London. appendix p. 18.

Atractaspididae
Snakes of Africa
Reptiles of Eswatini
Reptiles of South Africa
Reptiles described in 1849
Taxa named by Andrew Smith (zoologist)